Gamesmen of Kasar is a 1982 role-playing game adventure for Tunnels & Trolls published by Flying Buffalo.

Plot summary
Gamesmen of Kasar is a solo adventure in which a mysterious merchant from beyond Kasar has entered that city and purchased a building, and soon after, messengers arrive challenging all "to play the Game/Risk your life for wealth and fame".

Gamesmen of Kasar is solo scenario #17, for any character with up to 110 adds, in which the Gamemasters of Kasar offer riches to a hero who can win through their game.

Publication history
Gamesmen of Kasar was written by Roy Cram, with a cover by James Talbot and illustrations by Douglas Herring, and was published by Blade/Flying Buffalo in 1982 as a 40-page book, and published by Chris Harvey (U.K.) in 1983.

Reception
William Peschel reviewed Gamesmen of Kasar in The Space Gamer No. 62. Peschel commented that "The physical quality of the solo is excellent and up to Flying Buffalo standards. But in writing Gamesmen, Cram forgot to include anything to challenge the intellect of the player."

References

Role-playing game supplements introduced in 1982
Tunnels & Trolls adventures